Sparx may refer to:

Companies and brands
 Sparx Animation Studios, a French-Vietnamese CGI animation studio
 Sparx Systems, an Australian software company
 Sparx, an Indian footwear brand produced by Relaxo

Arts and entertainment
 Sparx (American band), a Latin-music band from New Mexico
 Sparx (Indonesian band), a band formed by the top five winners of the first season of Popstars Indonesia
 Sparx (musician), Iain James, British singer and producer
 Sparx (video game), a free online computer game
 Sparx (character), a DC Comics superheroine
 Sparx (Ace Lightning), a character from Ace Lightning
 Sparx, a character from Super Robot Monkey Team Hyperforce Go!
 Sparx the Dragonfly, a character from the Spyro video game series
 Lineysha Sparx, Puerto Rican drag queen

See also 
 Sparks (disambiguation)
 Spark (disambiguation)